The 2006 Kansas City Royals season was the 38th season for the franchise, and their 36th at Kauffman Stadium.  The Royals finishing 5th in the American League Central with a record of 62 wins and 100 losses and missed the playoffs for the 21st consecutive season.

Regular season

Season standings

Record vs. opponents

Roster

Player stats

Batting
Note: G = Games played; AB = At bats; H = Hits; Avg. = Batting average; HR = Home runs; RBI = Runs batted in

Other batters
Note: G = Games played; AB = At bats; H = Hits; Avg. = Batting average; HR = Home runs; RBI = Runs batted in

Note: Pitchers batting data also included above

Starting and other pitchers 
Note: G = Games pitched; IP = Innings pitched; W = Wins; L = Losses; ERA = Earned run average; SO = Strikeouts; CG = Complete games pitched; SHO = Shutouts

Relief pitchers 
Note: G = Games pitched; W = Wins; L = Losses; SV = Saves; ERA = Earned run average; SO = Strikeouts

Farm system

References

2006 Kansas City Royals team at Baseball-Reference
2006 Kansas City Royals team at baseball-almanac.com

Kansas City Royals seasons
Kansas City Royals
Kansas